Lamiae Lhabze (born 19 May 1984) is a Moroccan athlete competing in the 100 metres hurdles and 400 metres hurdles. She represented her country at the 2007 World Championships without advancing from the first round. In addition, she won multiple medals at international level.

She has personal bests of 55.51 seconds in the 400 metres hurdles (Mersin 2013) and 13.78 seconds in the 100 metres hurdles (−0.3 m/s, Khouribga 2013).

International competitions

References

Living people
1984 births
Moroccan female hurdlers
World Athletics Championships athletes for Morocco
Mediterranean Games silver medalists for Morocco
Mediterranean Games medalists in athletics
Athletes (track and field) at the 2013 Mediterranean Games
Athletes (track and field) at the 2019 African Games
Competitors at the 2005 Summer Universiade
Competitors at the 2007 Summer Universiade
African Games silver medalists for Morocco
Islamic Solidarity Games competitors for Morocco
African Games medalists in athletics (track and field)
20th-century Moroccan women
21st-century Moroccan women